Xiphiorhynchus is an extinct genus of prehistoric swordfish that lived from the Eocene until the Miocene. Unlike the modern swordfish, both the upper and lower jaws of Xiphiorhynchus were extended into blade-like points.

Distribution 
Fossils of Xiphiorhynchus have been found in:

Eocene
 La Meseta Formation, Antarctica
 London Clay, Selsey and Elmore Formations, England
 Yazoo Formation, Louisiana
 Moodys Branch Formation, Mississippi
 Castle Hayne Formation, North Carolina

Oligocene
 Chandler Bridge Formation, South Carolina

Miocene
 Raz-el-Ain Formation, Algeria
 Pisco Formation, Peru

See also 

 Prehistoric fish
 List of prehistoric bony fish

References

External links 
 Bony fish in the online Sepkoski Database

Prehistoric ray-finned fish genera
Ypresian genus first appearances
Miocene extinctions
Prehistoric fish of Africa
Neogene Africa
Fossils of Algeria
Prehistoric fish of Antarctica
Paleogene Antarctica
Fossils of Antarctica
Prehistoric fish of Europe
Paleogene United Kingdom
Fossils of England
Prehistoric fish of North America
Paleogene United States
Fossils of Louisiana
Fossils of Mississippi
Fossils of North Carolina
Fossils of South Carolina
Prehistoric fish of South America
Neogene Peru
Fossils of Peru
Fossil taxa described in 1871
Xiphiidae